Heather may refer to:

Plants
The heather family, or Ericaceae, particularly:
Common heather or ling, Calluna 
Various species of the genus Cassiope 
Various species of the genus Erica

Name
 Heather (given name)
 Heather (surname)

Arts and media
 Heathers, a 1989 film directed by Michael Lehmann
 Heathers: The Musical, a musical by Laurence O'Keefe based on the film
 Heathers (TV series), a 2018 television series based on the film
 "Heather" (The Secret Circle), a television episode

Music
 Heathers (band), an acoustic singing duo from Ireland
 "Heather" (Beatles song), an unreleased 1968 song by Paul McCartney and Donovan
 "Heather" (Conan Gray song), a 2020 song by American singer Conan Gray
 "Heather", a song from fusion drummer Billy Cobham's 1974 album Crosswinds
 "Heather", a 2001 song by Paul McCartney from the album Driving Rain
 "Heather", a song from Patent Pending by Heavens
 "Heather", a version of the Johnny Pearson song, "Autumn Reverie", which appeared on the Carpenters album Now & Then
”Heather”, a song from I Know Leopard’s album Love is a Landmine

Places
 Heather, Leicestershire, a village in England
 Heather Preceptory, a preceptory of the Knights Hospitaller, established in the above village
 Heather St John's Football Club, an English football club based in the above village
 Heather, Missouri, a community in the United States
 Heather, Washington, an unincorporated community in the United States

Other uses
 Heather (fabric), interwoven yarns of mixed colours producing muted greyish shades with flecks of colour
 Heather (yacht), the original name of the yacht USS Sea Gull, built in 1902
 Heather, brand name of a progestogen-only pill containing norethisterone (norethindrone)

See also
 Heath (disambiguation)
 Heather Hills (disambiguation)
 Hurricane Heather